The Gillig Spirit is a bus that was manufactured by Gillig Corporation from 1989 to 1991.  Marketed as a lower-cost alternative to the Gillig Phantom, the Spirit was produced as a transit bus.  Through its production run, the Spirit was produced in a 28-foot length, with a 96-inch wide body; like the Phantom, the Spirit was a high-floor bus.

In total, 250 examples of the Gillig Spirit were produced from its Hayward, California facility; all were sold in the United States.

Powertrain

Engines 

Caterpillar 3208
Cummins B5.9

Transmission 

Allison MT-643

See also 
Gillig Corporation
Gillig Phantom - a larger transit bus produced alongside the Gillig Spirit from 1980 to 2008.

References 
1. https://web.archive.org/web/20141109204623/http://busexplorer.com/PHP/FeaturePage.php?id=28 Retrieved 2014 - 11 - 9.

Gillig
Buses of the United States
Midibuses
Single-deck buses